Tiruchengode is a city and selection grade municipality located in southern Indian state of Tamil Nadu. It is famous for the ancient hilltop temple of Umaiorubagan (Arthanāreeshwara), dedicated to the unique combined male-female form of Lord Shiva and Goddess Parvathi (see Ardhanarishwara). This important place of pilgrimage is mentioned in the Tamil work Silapathikaram as 'Nedulkundru' and is celebrated in the hymns of Saivite saints. The equally famous Chenkottu Velavar Temple, dedicated to Lord Murugan, is situated on the same hill. As of 2011, the town had a population of 95,335. As per 2011 population, Tiruchengode is the largest city in Namakkal district. It is also famous for rig business.

History
This Tiruchengode was separated from Salem district several years before. 
In ancient days, Tiruchengode was known as Thirukodimaadachenkundrur – one of the historic places in Tamil Nadu.
Tiruchengode was formed on November 22  and that day is celebrated as tiruchengode day. It was also known as Thiruchengottankudi Nageswaram. It enshrines the Ardhanareeswarar (man-woman) manifestation of Shiva, representing the unity of Shiva and Parvati, is enshrined in this revered hill temple of great significance, accessible by a motorable road; this is an ancient temple mentioned in the Tamil work, Silappadikaram as Neduvelkunru. The red color of the hill is the reason that it was called Chengode. The image above shows the view of the surrounding area from the top of the Tiruchengode hill. This temple is regarded as the 4th of the 7 Tevara Stalams in the Kongu Region of Tamil Nadu.

 It is believed that Kannagi (Silappathikaram), after demolishing the city of Madurai by fire is called to Sorgam (Heaven) by her husband Kovalan and is in a wrath at the peak of the Tiruchengode hill.
 The modern history of Tiruchengode includes many memorable events. Eminent leaders like Rajaji, EVR Periar, T.S. Pattabiraman, T.M.Kaliyannan Gounder and EVK Sampath are bound to this town.
 Tiruchengode has the pride of having the country's first Gandhi Ashram a tribute to India's great leader Mahatma Gandhi and opened by country's then viceroy Rajaji (Rajagopalachari).

Location
Tiruchengode is in northwestern part of Tamil Nadu, approximately 20 km from the City of Erode, 46 km from Salem, and 120 km from Coimbatore.

Economy
Tiruchengode has a more industry-oriented occupation rather than agriculture. Agriculture is not done here on a large scale due to lack of abundant water supply as it is solely dependent on the Cauvery river that flows near Pallipalayam, Erode and also dependent on the occasional rains. The major industries here are Rig Spares, Power Looms and Textile Industries, Bus and Lorry Body Building, Lathe Industry, Rice Mills, Granite Factory, etc. Tiruchengode is well known for its Rig (Borewell) Lorries. Tiruchengode can be called "The Borewell Hub of India" as it manufactures the largest number of Borewell Vehicles operated in India. Nearly more than half of borewells operating across India are from Tiruchengode.

Demographics

According to 2011 census, Tiruchengode had a population of 95,335 with a sex-ratio of 994 females for every 1,000 males, much above the national average of 929. A total of 8,901 were under the age of six, constituting 4,495 males and 4,406 females. Scheduled Castes and Scheduled Tribes accounted for 11.36% and .07% of the population respectively. The average literacy of the town was 75.87%, compared to the national average of 72.99%. The town had a total of 26508 households. There were a total of 42,405 workers, comprising 329 cultivators, 686 main agricultural labourers, 1,279 in house hold industries, 38,804 other workers, 1,307 marginal workers, 7 marginal cultivators, 46 marginal agricultural labourers, 80 marginal workers in household industries and 1,174 other marginal workers. As per the religious census of 2011, Tiruchengode had 95.88% Hindus, 2.95% Muslims, 1.05% Christians, 0.02% Sikhs, 0.0% Buddhists, 0.0% Jains, 0.1% following other religions and 0.0% following no religion or did not indicate any religious preference.

District profile

 This city has various other names like Nagasalam, Panimalai, Kodhai Malai, Aravakiri, Vayu Malai, Kongumalai, Nagagiri, Vandhimalai, Siddharmalai, Didya and still more.
 It is a part of Kongu Nadu region of Tamil Nadu. Kongu Nadu includes in it 24 villages, out of which Poondhurai, a suburb of Erode city is one of the important pilgrimage centre. West of Cauvery is Melakarai Pundhurai and East of Cauvery is Kilakarai Pundhurai. Kilakarai Pundhurai is famously known as Thiruchengodu.
 The word "Thiruchengodu" means beautiful, steeped hill in Tamil Language.
 Thiruchengodu is famous for its reference in Kandhar Anuboothi sung by Arunagirinathar for Lord Murugan -as "Nagasala velava nalu kavi".
 Tiruchengodu is famous for its hill and the temple on the top.
 Ancient and historical Thiruchengodu is crowned with Mummurthies named Arthanareeswar, Chengodu Velan and Athikesava Perumal.
 The average annual rainfall is around 950 mm. The altitude is about 150–200 metres asl.
 Around Tiruchengode many schools and colleges are there.

The Temples
Ardhanareeswarar, one of the 64 manifestations of Shiva, representing the unity of Shiva and Parvati, is enshrined in this revered hill temple of great significance, accessible by a motorable road.  This temple is regarded as the 4th of the 7 Tevara Stalams in the Kongu Region of Tamil Nadu.

Ancient walls, mandapams and sculptured pillars (now in a state of disrepair) add to the awe that this temple perpetuates, on top of the hill. The motorway and the renovated Rajagopuram are of recent origin. True to the name Nagagiri, there is a 60 ft long snake carved on the hill.

Although the sanctum faces the West, entrance to it is from the South. A majestic image of Ardanareeswarar adorns the sanctum. There is a water spring at the foot of the image which is said to have been divinely manifested (Uli Padaa Uruvam). There are inscriptions here from the times of Parantaka Chola, Gangaikonda Chola, the Vijayanagar and Mysore Kings and the Nayaks.

 kannagi after burning madurai finally reached Tiruchengode hill and she was taken by pushpak viman and went to heaven. Kannagi vizhla is celebrated with pomp and glory every year.

Uttsavamurti of this temple is in the Cleveland Museum of Art, Cleveland, USA.

The Tiruchengottuvelavar shrine (to Subramanyar) attracts a number of pilgrims.

Sambandar composed the Tiruneelakandapatikam here, to help rid fellow travellers of an affliction. Muthuswamy Dikshitar has sung of this shrine in Ardhanareeswaram in Kumudakriya.
Kailasanathar Temple, another famous temple of Tiruchengode is located at the foothills, at Kamalar.
Tiruchengode also has an Anjaneya swamy temple renovated three years before, Bathrakaliamman temple which had Kumbabishekam on 21-04-2010 and an Ayyappan temple which are very famous among the residents.
Sri Dhevi Bhudevi Sametha Sundhara Raja Perumal
The Sri Sundararaja Perumal Temple is located in the Kanakapatti village. The temple is dedicated to Lord Vishnu in the form of Sundararajan, a synonym of love and beauty.
soothaga kulam(thoorankootam in tamil) periyandavar(gods god) and perumal temple at panneerkuthi palayam

 soothaga kulam (thoorangkootam in tamil) perumal and periyandavar temple located in panneerkuthipalayam village from 8 km from Tiruchengode bus stand.
 In earlier time this village was called as pirithi kumarapalayam. But now changed that name into pannikuthipalayam in the remembrance of one big festivel is conducting every five years once in this temple. At that time sacrifice the pig (in tamil panni) to the god periyandavar.

Arulmigu Muthu Mariamman Temple-Sattaiyampudur

Arulmigu Muthu Muniyappan Temple, Arulmigu Muthu Kumaraswamy Temple and Arulmigu Muthu Mariamman Temple located in Sattaiyampudur, Tiruchengode Taluk,Namakkal DT.

Kandaswami (Murugan) Temple
Kalippatti Kandaswami Temple. This Temple is located in Kalippatti, Thiruchengode Taluk, Namakkal DT.

Festivals
Tiruchengode's major Festival is the Arthanareeswarar Car Festival known as Vaigasi Visakam (Celebrated during the Tamil month of Vaikasi). The Festival is celebrated for 15 days, with separate cars carrying sengottuvelavar, arthanareeswarar and many small lords. This festival is very famous among the nearby surrounding towns and villages.

Three worship services are offered each day. The late night worship service (Artha Jaama Pooja) is considered to be of importance here. New moon days are also considered to be special.
Moliapalli annamar swamy temple is located 15 km from thiruchengodu.

Transport
Tiruchengode is well connected by state as well as private buses from Chennai, Coimbatore, Trichy, Erode, Salem, Namakkal, Rasipuram, Karur, Sankagiri, Attur, Kallakkurichi, Paramathi-Velur, Komarapalayam, Bhavani, Edappadi, Bangalore, Hyderabad etc.,
The nearest railway station is Sankari Durg (8 km) & Erode Cauvery RS (16 km) The nearest major Railway Junction Erode (23 km), Namakkal (37 km), Rasipuram (36 km) and Salem (46 km) The nearest sub railway station for Anangur(8 km).

The nearest airport is at Salem Airport(46 km), Coimbatore International Airport (120 km) & Tiruchirappalli International Airport (120 km)

Mobile and landline communications are well connected in tiruchengode having exchanges in Tiruchengode and Kootappalli. Mobile connection having 4G GSM services of all major networks.

Notable people

T.R. Sundaram Mudaliyar (16 July 1907 – 30 August 1963) was an Indian film actor, director, and producer more than 100 flims. He was the founder of the Salem-based film production company Modern Theatres Ltd.

Politics
Tiruchengode assembly constituency is part of Tiruchengode (Lok Sabha constituency). Recently, it has been included in the Namakkal Parliamentary constituency - from the 2009 elections onwards.[3]

Tiruchengode Municipality
The Tiruchengode Municipality is the civic body that governs the town of Tiruchengode

Chronological List of Chairmen
 V.V.C.R. Kandappa Mudaliar 
 Pachiyannan Mudaliar 
 M.P.R. Arthanari Mudaliar
 T.P. Arumugam Mudaliar 3 times elected chairman and ex MLA.
 R. Natesan
 Pon Saraswathi

Nalini Sengundhar (Chairman from  2022)

See also
 Thirukodimaadachenkundrur
 Tiruchengode (Lok Sabha constituency)

References

External links

About Tiruchengode City
Link to download TiruchengodeCity App
About Ardhanareeswarar Hill Temple
About Chenkottu Velavar Temple

Cities and towns in Namakkal district